The 2015–16 Israeli Noar Premier League was the 21st season since its introduction in 1994 as the top-tier football in Israel for teenagers between the ages 18–20, and the 5th under the name Noar Premier League.

League table

References

External links
 2014-2015 Noar Premier League IFA 

Israeli Noar Premier League seasons
Youth